The Rea Award for the Short Story is an annual award given to a living American or Canadian author chosen for unusually significant contributions to short story fiction.

The Award

The Rea Award is named after Michael M. Rea, who was engaged in the real estate and radio industries, and was a passionate writer and collector of short stories.  In 1986 he established the award, setting up the Dungannon Foundation to administer it. Rea died in 1996 and his widow, Elizabeth Richebourg Rea, currently administers the award process.  A jury of three notable literary figures is selected and given complete independence to choose a winner of the award, which includes a grant of $30,000.

The winners

1986 Cynthia Ozick
1987 Robert Coover
1988 Donald Barthelme
1989 Tobias Wolff
1990 Joyce Carol Oates
1991 Paul Bowles
1992 Eudora Welty
1993 Grace Paley
1994 Tillie Olsen
1995 Richard Ford
1996 Andre Dubus
1997 Gina Berriault
1998 John Edgar Wideman
1999 Joy Williams
2000 Deborah Eisenberg
2001 Alice Munro
2002 Mavis Gallant
2003 Antonya Nelson
2004 Lorrie Moore
2005 Ann Beattie
2006 John Updike
2007 Stuart Dybek
2008 Amy Hempel
2009 Mary Robison
2010 James Salter
2011 Charles Baxter
2012 Richard Bausch
2013 Elizabeth Spencer
2014 T. Coraghessan Boyle
2015 Andrea Barrett
2016 Jim Shepard

References
Official website: http://www.reaaward.org/preface.html

American literary awards
Awards established in 1986